The Opposition is a 2016 investigative documentary. directed by Hollie Fifer. The film follows Joe Moses as he struggles to save his community from policemen wielding machetes and guns descending on the Paga Hill Settlement to bulldoze their houses to the ground.

The Opposition was produced by Madeleine Hetherton-Miau and Rebecca Barry from the production company Media Stockade.

The Opposition won the 2018 OzFlix Independent Film Awards and was nominated for ‘Best Documentary Feature Film’ at the 2017 Asia Pacific Screen Awards. The film was also awarded the Grand Prize of the Jury at the 2017 International Pacific Documentary Film Festival FIFO. In 2017, The Opposition was one of the finalists for ‘Feature Documentary of the Year’ at the Screen Producers Australia Awards.

Festivals and Awards

References 

Australian documentary films
2016 films